The Miller Farmstead is a historic district encompassing the main farm complex on Route 57, at Watters Road, in Mansfield Township, Warren County, New Jersey and extending into Lebanon Township, Hunterdon County. The farmstead is near the community of Penwell and overlooks the Musconetcong River, arranged linearly along the upper edge of the river's flood plain. It was added to the National Register of Historic Places on September 11, 1989, for its significance in agriculture, architecture, and transportation from 1830 to 1924. The listing is a  area that includes eight contributing buildings, seven contributing structures, and a contributing site.

The main farmhouse, at the intersection of Route 57 and Watters Road, shows Greek Revival style. It was likely built in the 1830s or 1840s. One of the contributing structures is a triple-arch stone bridge, the Old Turnpike Road over Musconetcong River bridge. The bridge spans into Lebanon Township in Hunterdon County. It was built in 1860 by J.C. Miller and J.A. Skinner, according to a marble plaque on one of the sidewalls.

Gallery

See also
 National Register of Historic Places listings in Warren County, New Jersey
 National Register of Historic Places listings in Hunterdon County, New Jersey
 List of bridges on the National Register of Historic Places in New Jersey

References

External links
 
  Also known as Wydner Farm Bridge.
 
 

Historic districts on the National Register of Historic Places in New Jersey
Stone arch bridges
National Register of Historic Places in Hunterdon County, New Jersey
National Register of Historic Places in Warren County, New Jersey
New Jersey Register of Historic Places
Greek Revival architecture in New Jersey
Commercial buildings completed in 1830
Lebanon Township, New Jersey
Mansfield Township, Warren County, New Jersey